Travis McCullough (born October 3, 1984) is an American professional racing driver who competes full-time in the SPEARS SRL Southwest Tour Series, driving the No. 36 for his own family team, McCullough Racing. as well as part-time in the NASCAR Craftsman Truck Series, driving a Toyota Tundra for G2G Racing.

Racing career

Early career
In 2000, McCullough raced mini stocks at Delta Speedway.

In 2005, McCullough ran and was the lead instructor of the Uraceit racing school in Altamont Speedway.

In 2019, McCullough would finish third in the Lucas Oil Modified Series in points.

In 2021, McCullough would earn his first career victory in the SPEARS SRL Southwest Tour Series at the Irwindale Event Center. Since then, he has gained one more victory in the series.

On June 8, 2022, G2G Racing announced that McCullough would attempt to make his Truck Series debut in the team's No. 47 truck in the race at Sonoma. However, McCullough was unable to drive the truck at all due to his drug test results not coming in in time for practice. (As it was his first start of the season, he had to take a drug test beforehand.) The No. 47 truck would end up being withdrawn from the race.

On July 27, 2022, McCullough and G2G owner Tim Viens both tweeted that McCullough would run a race for the team in 2023 after being unable to hit the track at Sonoma.

Motorsports career results

NASCAR
(key) (Bold – Pole position awarded by qualifying time. Italics – Pole position earned by points standings or practice time. * – Most laps led.)

Craftsman Truck Series

References

External links 
 

1984 births
Living people
NASCAR drivers
Racing drivers from California
People from Lodi, California